Cold Saturday, or Cold Saturday Farm, is a historic home and farm complex located near Finksburg, Carroll County, Maryland. The house is significant for embodying the characteristics of Anglo-American gentry farms that are common in the Tidewater region.

It was listed on the National Register of Historic Places in 2008.

References

External links
 at Maryland Historical Trust
The History of Cold Saturday Farm blog

English-American history
English-American culture in Maryland
Houses on the National Register of Historic Places in Maryland
Federal architecture in Maryland
Houses completed in 1800
Houses in Carroll County, Maryland
National Register of Historic Places in Carroll County, Maryland